Ardersier  is a small former fishing village in the Scottish Highlands on the Moray Firth near Fort George, between Inverness and Nairn. Its name may be an anglicisation of the Gaelic "Àird nan Saor", or "Headland of the joiners", one local legend being that carpenters working on the construction of ecclesiastical buildings on the other side of the Moray Firth were quartered here.

Prior to the building of Fort George, a small fishing hamlet called Blacktown existed in the area of Fort George, with an economy based on small-scale commercial fishery. Its relocation eventually led to the creation of the village of Ardersier.

History

Medieval

Parts of the land in and about Ardersier were originally owned by the order of the Knights Templar. These lands were referred to as: Temple Land, Temple Cruik, Temple Bank, Bogschand. They were located between Connage and the sea, and between Flemington and the sea. The Temple lands of Ardersier were held by Davidsons and Mackays as portioners. They were acquired by Cawdor in 1626.

A charter granted at Nairn refers to the locus trialis at Ardersier, and according to the historian George Bain, this may have been an ancient place of trial by wager of battle.

Clan feuds

Church lands of Ardersier owned by the Bishop of Ross and Delnies had passed into the hands of the Leslies of Ardersier, and they sold them on to Cawdor in the year 1574, "having consideration of the great and intolerable damage, injury, and skaith done to them by Lachlan Mackintosh and others of the Clan Chattan, in harrying, destroying, and making hardships upon the said hail lands of Ardersier and fishings thereof," and no apparent hope of reparation for the "customary enormities of the said Clan Chattan." It is charged against the Mackintoshes that they depauperised the tenants, debarred them from fishing at the stell of Ardersier, breaking their boats and cutting their nets. The Laird of Cawdor was not allowed to have peaceable possession, and he raised an action against Lachlan Mackintosh and his clansmen for the slaughter of several of his servants and tenants. In 1581, Lachlan renounced all claim to the Ardersier lands and to Wester and Easter Delnies, and the legal proceedings were dropped.

Jacobite rising

After the Jacobite rising of 1745, there was a fear of further French-supported risings, especially of the possibility of a naval assault quickly landing a large number of rebels. The fort provided the facility to house an increased number of soldiers (compared to the original Fort George built elsewhere in 1727) and its position on the coast both guarded the Firth at its narrowest point, and allowed for supplies to be brought in by sea in the event of a land siege.

The requirement for the fort to be built opposite Chanonry Point where the firth narrowed considerably, meant that the population of Blacktown, a small fishing hamlet, had to resettle about a mile away on the shores of the Moray Firth. Here were founded two different communities, separated by land ownership and religion. The narrow strip of land on which Stewart-town was built belonged to the Earl of Moray and fell within the parish of Petty. Literally across the road, the householders of Campbell-town worshipped in the church of Ardersier, This land belonging to the Earl of Cawdor, a Campbell. Collectively these two settlements were later referred to as Ardersier, but it was not officially known as such until the late 1970s, thus presenting confusion on postal deliveries to the other Campbeltown in Argyll.

Present

Today the village remains a popular tourist spot due to the pleasant views, the shore, and the proximity to Fort George, which remains an active base for the British Army. The post office closed in the village a few years ago but the service re-located to a local shop. There is an old church that is not in use and a 'new' church called Ardersier Parish Church which is where Helen Mirren and Taylor Hackford were married in 1997. There are two small shops (RS McColl & Spar (the Spar was formerly known as Mary's flowers, owner Mary Douglas, who supplied flowers for Helen Mirren and Taylor Hackford's Wedding) – which offers the postal service), a pharmacy, a hairdressers, several B&B's, two pubs (The Gun Lodge and the Star) and a hotel.

Local residents are active in regenerating Ardersier, to see it once again a thriving village. They formed their own community company in December 2009 to take over local community buildings to create a Community Hub.

In 2013, refurbishing was started of Ardersier War Memorial Hall. It re-opened for the public in 2014.

Notable residents
Pryse Lockhart Gordon, memoirist
Donald Laing, farmer and politician
Sir Herbert Macpherson, Victoria Cross recipient was born here
Peter Peacock, Scottish Labour Party politician
Callum Skinner, Olympic cyclist

References

External links

 Ardersier Community Homepage
 Ardersier and Petty Community Council
 ARDCO

History of the petroleum industry in the United Kingdom
Populated places in the County of Nairn